In mathematics, a norm form is a homogeneous form in n variables constructed from the field norm of a field extension L/K of degree n. That is, writing N for the norm mapping to K, and selecting a basis e1, ..., en for L as a vector space over K, the form is given by

N(x1e1 + ... + xnen)

in variables x1, ..., xn.

In number theory norm forms are studied as Diophantine equations, where they generalize, for example, the Pell equation. For this application the field K is usually the rational number field, the field L is an algebraic number field, and the basis is taken of some order in the ring of integers OL of L.

See also
Trace form

References

Field (mathematics)
Diophantine equations
Homogeneous polynomials